Laitaure is a lake in Lapland, Sweden which is formed by the Rapa River.

See also
Kungsleden

References

Further reading

Sarek National Park
Lakes of Norrbotten County